William Richert (1942 – July 19, 2022) was an American film director, producer, screenwriter and actor. He is known for writing and directing the feature films Winter Kills, The American Success Company, and A Night in the Life of Jimmy Reardon.

Biography 
Richert was born in Florida. At the age of 19, he interviewed Richard Nixon's daughters Tricia and Julie, as part of a planned documentary titled Presidents' Daughters. He directed several other documentaries (including Derby and A Dancer's Life) and the feature films Winter Kills, The American Success Company, A Night in the Life of Jimmy Reardon, and The Man in the Iron Mask (also known as The Mask of Dumas).

In 1982, Richert co-founded Invisible Studio, re-acquiring the rights to The American Success Company and Winter Kills, and re-editing and re-releasing both films.

Richert's film  A Night in the Life of Jimmy Reardon was originally distributed by 20th Century Fox, but was later re-cut and re-issued independently under the title Aren't You Even Going To Kiss Me Goodbye?

As an actor, Richert played Bob Pigeon in the 1991 Gus van Sant film My Own Private Idaho. He played Aramis in his 1998 production of The Man in the Iron Mask. He played Patrick McKennan in the 1999 television movie A.T.F.

He died at his home in Portland, Oregon, on July 19, 2022, at the age of 79.

Controversy 
Richert sued the Writers Guild of America over not being credited on the screenplay of the 1995 film The American President. Richert claimed Sorkin's screenplay was a thinly veiled plagiarism of Richert's 1981 screenplay The President Elopes. After Guild arbitration, Aaron Sorkin was awarded full credit on American President. Richert also claimed that the television series The West Wing was derived from part of the same screenplay.

Richert also sued the Directors Guild of America over its collection of overseas levies for American directors who are not members.

Filmography
 1971 Derby (documentary) (Producer)
 1972 A Dancer's Life (a.k.a. First Position; documentary) (Writer/Director)
 1974 Law and Disorder (with Kenneth Harris Fishman and Ivan Passer) (Writer)
 1975 The Happy Hooker (Writer)
 1976 Crime and Passion (a.k.a. Ace Up My Sleeve, with Ivan Passer and Pat Silver) (Writer)
 1979 Winter Kills (Writer/Director)
 1980 The American Success Company (a.k.a. American Success and Success) (Writer/Director)
 1988 A Night in the Life of Jimmy Reardon (a.k.a. Aren't You Even Gonna Kiss Me Goodbye?) (Writer/Director)
 1991 My Own Private Idaho as Bob Pigeon (Actor)
 1994 The Client as Harry 'Mac' Bono (Actor)
 1998 The Man in the Iron Mask (a.k.a. The Face of Alexandre Dumas: The Man in the Iron Mask, with Edward Albert, Dana Barron, Rex Ryon and Timothy Bottoms) (Writer/Director)

References

External links
 
 
 Stream Episode 1 of 'The Vindicator'
 Stream the entirety of Richert's picture Success

1942 births
2022 deaths
American film directors
American film producers
American screenwriters
Film directors from Florida